Goleta (Spanish for "Schooner") is a city in southern Santa Barbara County, California, United States. It was incorporated as a city in 2002, after a long period as the largest unincorporated populated area in the county. As of the 2000 census, the census-designated place had a total population of 55,204. A significant portion of the census territory of 2000 did not incorporate into the new city. The population of Goleta was 32,690 at the 2020 census. It is known for being near the University of California, Santa Barbara, campus.

History

Early history

The area of present-day Goleta was populated for thousands of years by the native Chumash people. Locally they became known by the Spanish as Canaliños because they lived along the coast adjacent to the Channel Islands. One of the largest villages, S'axpilil, was north of the Goleta Slough, not far from the present-day Santa Barbara Airport.

The first European visitor to the Goleta area was the Spanish mariner Juan Rodríguez Cabrillo, who spent time around the Channel Islands in 1542, and died there in 1543. During the 1980s, discovery of some 16th-century cannon on the beach led to the advancement of a theory that Sir Francis Drake sailed into the Goleta Slough in 1579. Goleta is one of many alternative locations (and the one farthest south) proposed for Drake's "New Albion", generally believed to be today's Drake's Bay, north of San Francisco.

In 1602, another sailing expedition, led by Sebastian Vizcaino, visited the California Coast. Vizcaino named the channel Santa Barbara. Spanish ships associated with the Manila Galleon trade probably stopped in the area intermittently during the next 167 years, but no permanent settlements were established.

The first land expedition to California, led by Gaspar de Portolà, spent several days in the area in 1769, on its way to Monterey Bay, and spent the night of August 20 near a creek (possibly San Pedro Creek) to the north of the Goleta estuary. At that time, the estuary was a very large open-water lagoon that covered most of what is now the city of Goleta, and extended as far north as Lake Los Carneros (adjacent to Stow House). There were at least five native towns in the area, the largest on an island in the middle of the lagoon. For that reason, expedition engineer Miguel Costanso called the group of towns Pueblos de la Isla. Some of the soldiers called the island town Mescaltitlan, after a similar Aztec island town in Mexico. Franciscan missionary Juan Crespi, who accompanied the expedition, gave the towns the name Santa Margarita de Cortona.

The island retained the name Mescalitan Island (dropping the extra Aztec "t") until it was bulldozed flat in 1941 to provide fill for the military airfield that is now Santa Barbara airport (SBA). The Wastewater Treatment Plant of the Goleta Sanitary District is located on what used to be the island.

Portola returned to San Diego by the same route in January 1770, and mounted a second expedition to Monterey that year. A second Spanish expedition came to the Santa Barbara area of Alta California in 1774, led by Juan Bautista de Anza. De Anza returned the next year, and the road along the coast of Santa Barbara County (today's Highway 1) soon became the El Camino Real, connecting the string of Spanish missions.

An expedition in 1782, led by military governor Felipe de Neve, founded the Presidio of Santa Barbara and, soon thereafter, the Santa Barbara Mission. The Goleta area, along with most of the coastal areas of today's Santa Barbara County, was placed in the jurisdiction of the presidio and mission.

Sometime after the De Anza expeditions, a sailing ship ("goleta") was wrecked at the mouth of the lagoon, and remained visible for many years, giving the area its current name. After Mexico became independent of Spain in 1821, most of the former mission ranch lands were divided up into large grants. The Goleta area became part of two adjacent ranchos. To the east of today's Fairview Avenue was Rancho La Goleta, named for the shipwreck and granted to Daniel A. Hill, the first American resident of Santa Barbara. An 1840s diseño (claim map) of the rancho shows the wrecked ship.

The parts of Goleta to the west of Fairview Avenue were in Rancho Dos Pueblos, granted in 1842 to Irish immigrant Nicholas Den, son-in-law of Daniel Hill. Rancho Dos Pueblos included the lagoon, airport, UCSB and Isla Vista, extending to the west as far as the eastern boundary of today's El Capitan State Beach.

19th and 20th centuries

The Goleta Valley was a prominent lemon-growing region during the late 19th and early 20th centuries, and was largely agricultural. Several areas, especially the Ellwood Mesa, were developed for oil and natural gas extraction. In the 1920s, aviation pioneers started using portions of the Goleta Slough that had silted-in due to agriculture to land and takeoff. As former tidelands, the title to these lands was unclear. Starting in 1940, boosters from the city of Santa Barbara lobbied and obtained federal funding and passed a bond measure to formally develop an airport on the Goleta Slough. The necessity for an airport – or at least a military airfield – became more apparent after a Japanese submarine shelled the Ellwood Oil Field in 1942. This was one of the few direct-fire attacks on the U.S. continent during WWII. The Marine Corps undertook completion of the airport and established Marine Corps Air Station Santa Barbara on the site of the current airport and University of California, Santa Barbara campus.

After the war, Goleta Valley residents supported the construction of Lake Cachuma, which provided water, enabling a housing boom and the establishment of research and aerospace firms in the area. In 1954, the University of California, Santa Barbara moved to part of the former Marine base. Along with the boom in aerospace, the character changed from rural-agricultural to high-tech. Goleta remains a center for high-tech firms, and a bedroom community for neighboring Santa Barbara.

Incorporation
Goleta was incorporated as a city in 2002 after several unsuccessful attempts. A significant urbanized area remains unincorporated between the cities of Goleta and Santa Barbara, largely consisting of the area which polled against incorporation prior to the 2002 election (this area was excluded from the city boundaries to facilitate approval of incorporation). There has been some discussion of annexation of this area (sometimes dubbed "Noleta") by the city of Santa Barbara.

In addition, the student community of Isla Vista directly to the south was excluded from the new city of Goleta. Whether or not to include Isla Vista was a subject of debate during incorporation planning, including Goleta residents concerned about impacts on tax revenue and the voting patterns of students. A Local Agency Formation Commission report supported excluding Isla Vista because of differences in "community identity", but considered both including and excluding Isla Vista to be viable choices.

Postal shooting
On January 30, 2006, Jennifer San Marco shot and killed seven people, including six postal workers, before committing suicide at the postal processing facility where she had been previously employed. The dead included Charlotte Colton, 44, Beverly Graham, 54, Ze Fairchild, 37, Maleka Higgins, 28, Nicola Grant, 42, Guadalupe Swartz, 52, and Dexter Shannon, 57. This incident is believed to be the deadliest workplace shooting ever carried out in the United States by a woman.

Geography

Nearby is the Santa Barbara campus of the University of California and the student community of Isla Vista.

Geology

It consists of Holocene and Pleistocene alluvium, colluvium, estuarine deposits, as well as marine terraces created during interglacial high sea level episodes. The area has been subject to rapid geologic uplift, as evidenced by its coastal bluffs and narrow beaches. Between the flattest part of the Goleta Valley and the ocean is an area of uplift paralleling the shore which includes, from west to east, Isla Vista, Mescalitan Island, More Mesa, and the Hope Ranch Hills. The elevation of this block of land relative to Goleta Valley increases from 40 to 300 feet along this length. The uplift was caused by motion along the More Ranch Fault, one of the most geologically active faults in the area. The More Ranch Fault roughly follows a line along El Colegio Road, through the southern part of the airport, along Atascadero Creek, and then continues east into Santa Barbara as the Mission Ridge Fault Zone. Soils in Goleta are mostly well drained brown fine sandy loam of the Milpitas series.

Underneath the alluvial units of the coastal plain are three prominent bedrock units:  the Monterey Formation, the Sisquoc Formation, and the Santa Barbara Formation. This latter unit is the principal groundwater aquifer for the region, and its freshwater wells are protected from seawater intrusion by the uplift along the More Ranch Fault, which has placed relatively impermeable rock units between it and the ocean.

Some of the underlying sedimentary units contain economically recoverable quantities of oil and gas. The Ellwood Oil Field was worked beginning in the 1920s, with its onshore portions only being dismantled in the 1970s. The La Goleta Gas Field was formerly productive on the bluffs west of More Mesa, and is now used for gas storage by the Southern California Gas Company.

The Santa Ynez Mountains form a scenic backdrop to Goleta. They consist of multiple layers of sandstone and conglomerate units dating from the Jurassic Age to the present, uplifted rapidly since the Pliocene. Rapid uplift has given them their craggy, scenic character, and numerous landslides and debris flows, which form some of the urban and suburban lowland area, are testament to their geologically active nature. Covered by chaparral, the range exceeds  in height to the northwest of Goleta, at Broadcast and Santa Ynez Peaks. Sundowner winds occur in both Goleta and Santa Barbara.

Wildlife

Bobcats can also be seen in the area. Coyotes sometimes prey on small domestic pets. Skunks sometimes spray, and often fall prey to cars, owls, dogs, and coyotes. Raccoons can become neighborhood pests. Opossums commonly inhabit neighborhoods. Dogs and cats sometimes kill small animals. Monarch butterflies spend the winter in several eucalyptus groves on the Ellwood Mesa. Bears and Mountain Lions live in the foothills and mountains around the town, but are rarely seen by residents.

Climate
Goleta has a mediterranean climate influenced by maritime winds from the Pacific Ocean with moderate average temperatures. That is a relatively large thermal span for a shoreline town.

Chilly days and warm nights are rare. The warmest night measured is a freak event of  during a heat snap in 1979, a full  warmer than the second warmest night on record. During a regular year, the warmest night is at a mild .

Demographics

2010
At the 2010 census Goleta had a population of 29,888. The racial makeup of Goleta was 20,833 (69.7%) White, 469 (1.6%) African American, 283 (0.9%) Native American, 2,728 (9.1%) Asian, 26 (0.1%) Pacific Islander, 4,182 (14.0%) from other races, and 1,367 (4.6%) from two or more races. Hispanic or Latino of any race were 9,824 persons (32.9%).

The census reported that 29,687 people (99.3% of the population) lived in households, 23 (0.1%) lived in non-institutionalized group quarters, and 178 (0.6%) were institutionalized.

There were 10,903 households, 3,416 (31.3%) had children under the age of 18 living in them, 5,265 (48.3%) were opposite-sex married couples living together, 1,069 (9.8%) had a female householder with no husband present, 472 (4.3%) had a male householder with no wife present. There were 659 (6.0%) unmarried opposite-sex partnerships, and 88 (0.8%) same-sex married couples or partnerships. 2,732 households (25.1%) were one person and 1,090 (10.0%) had someone living alone who was 65 or older. The average household size was 2.72. There were 6,806 families (62.4% of households); the average family size was 3.23.

The age distribution was 6,335 people (21.2%) under the age of 18, 3,790 people (12.7%) aged 18 to 24, 7,966 people (26.7%) aged 25 to 44, 7,749 people (25.9%) aged 45 to 64, and 4,048 people (13.5%) who were 65 or older.  The median age was 36.5 years. For every 100 females, there were 101.3 males. For every 100 females age 18 and over, there were 100.2 males.

There were 11,473 housing units at an average density of 1,438.7 per square mile, of the occupied units 5,844 (53.6%) were owner-occupied and 5,059 (46.4%) were rented. The homeowner vacancy rate was 1.2%; the rental vacancy rate was 4.5%. 16,222 people (54.3% of the population) lived in owner-occupied housing units and 13,465 people (45.1%) lived in rental housing units.

2000

Demographic data for 2000 is for the Goleta CDP, the Goleta Valley area, which is approximately twice the size of the City of Goleta.

At the 2000 census there were 55,204 people, 19,954 households, and 13,468 families in the CDP. The racial makeup of the CDP was 78.61% White, 1.27% African American, 0.82% Native American, 6.43% Asian, 0.11% Pacific Islander, 9.23% from other races, and 3.53% from two or more races. Hispanic or Latino of any race were 22.33%.

Of the 19,954 households 30.6% had children under the age of 18 living with them, 55.1% were married couples living together, 8.7% had a female householder with no husband present, and 32.5% were non-families. 22.5% of households were one person and 8.8% were one person aged 65 or older. The average household size was 2.72 and the average family size was 3.18.

The age distribution was 23.1% under the age of 18, 9.5% from 18 to 24, 28.6% from 25 to 44, 24.2% from 45 to 64, and 14.6% 65 or older. The median age was 38 years. For every 100 females, there were 98.4 males. For every 100 females age 18 and over, there were 96.1 males.

The median household income was $60,314 and the median family income  was $67,956 (these figures had risen to $69,242 and $81,862 respectively as of a 2007 estimate). Males had a median income of $44,770 versus $32,127 for females. The per capita income for the CDP was $28,890.  About 2.9% of families and 6.7% of the population were below the poverty line, including 4.8% of those under age 18 and 4.4% of those age 65 or over.

Economy

The University of California, Santa Barbara is the major center of economic activity in the area, both directly and through the numerous associated service industry activities which exist for the staff and students. Hispanic Business had its corporate headquarters in Goleta.

Deckers Outdoor Corporation is based in Goleta. It is the parent company for UGG Australia, Teva, Sanuk, Ahnu and Hoka One One. Several technology sector businesses operate in the area due to the proximity to the university, including Raytheon, Lockheed Martin, Northrop Grumman, AppFolio, FLIR and InTouch.

The Bacara Resort, located at the western edge of the city, also employs many residents.

Cannabis

Following the statewide passage of Proposition 64 in 2016, the city began accepting retail applications on a first-come, first-served basis in August 2018. The City limits the number of recreational retail cannabis businesses to six. In November 2018, the voters of Goleta passed Measure Z-2018, establishing a tax on cannabis business operations within the city.  A medical marijuana dispensary was issued the first license for sales of recreational cannabis and began selling in January 2020. Companies must be licensed by the local agency and the state to grow, test, or sell cannabis and the city may authorize none or only some of these activities. Local governments may not prohibit adults, who are in compliance with state laws, from growing, using, or transporting marijuana for personal use.

Energy 
In 2017 the city established an ambitious goal of supplying 100% of the city's municipal facilities and community-wide electricity supply with renewable power by 2030. The city also resolved to have at least 50% of electricity use by municipal facilities come from renewable sources by 2025. In 2019 the City adopted a Strategic Energy Plan as a roadmap on how to accomplish this, which includes switching to Central Coast Community Energy as the default energy provider for its residences and businesses beginning in 2021. The city is currently moving forward with a contract to install solar panels in the parking lot of City Hall in 2021 and exploring future opportunities for electric vehicle (EV) charging stations and a microgrid, which will provide increased resiliency in case of a power disruption.

Parks and recreation

Goleta has several parks, including Stow Park, Girsh Park, Jonny D. Wallis Neighborhood Park, Lake Los Carneros and Coronado Butterfly preserve, the largest over-wintering grove of the Monarch butterfly, providing street access to the Ellwood Mesa Open Space on the bluffs overlooking the Pacific Ocean with beach access from UCSB. Goleta Beach County Park is just outside of the city limits. Historic sites include the Stow House and the South Coast Railroad Museum.

Government
Until 2018, the five city council members took turns as mayor. In November, 2018, Paula Perotte was elected to a two-year term as Mayor, defeating fellow council member Michael Bennett. This was the first election in City history where residents voted for Mayor as opposed to the Mayor being selected by City Council for a one-year term. The city council also serves as the planning agency. City council, planning commission, and design review board meetings are televised on the local government-access television channel and available on the city's website.

Municipal Election History 
Goleta's cityhood was established through Measure H-2001 in the November 2001 election. At this time, the first five members of the City Council were also elected, and they officially began their terms on February 1, 2002. Thereafter, the city has held elections during the November general election on even years. Terms of the City Council are 4 years. Until 2018 the Mayor was selected by the members of the City Council to serve a one-year term. In November 2016 voters approved Measure C-2016 which called for a directly elected Mayor with a term of two years, beginning in the next general election (2018). In November 2020 voters approved Measure O-2020 which changed the term of the Mayor from two years to four years.

(*) Ed Easton stepped down in 2014, and Tony Vallejo was appointed to fill the remainder of his term

Education
Most local students attend schools in the Goleta Union School District and the Santa Barbara High School District. There are also a host of smaller private schools.

Schools

Elementary
Brandon School (within City of Goleta)
El Camino School
Ellwood School (within City of Goleta)
Foothill School
Hollister School
Isla Vista School
Kellogg School (within City of Goleta)
La Patera School (within City of Goleta)
Mountain View School
Goleta Family School

Secondary
Goleta Valley Junior High
Dos Pueblos High School

Transportation
Several Santa Barbara Metropolitan Transit District bus lines run through the city. The main artery of the city is U.S. 101, with the major streets being Hollister Avenue and Cathedral Oaks Road. Other significant streets include Calle Real (which is broken into sections), Storke Road/Glen Annie Road, Los Carneros Road, Fairview Avenue, and Patterson Avenue. 

Intercity transit is provided by Amtrak at the Goleta Amtrak Station.

Santa Barbara Airport is adjacent to the City of Goleta, near the intersection of Hollister and South Fairview avenues. The airport serves the greater Santa Barbara area with five airlines connecting to larger hubs.

Major highways
 U.S. Route 101
 State Route 217

Notable people
 Carl Barks, an American comics illustrator and writer. Barks is best known for his comics featuring Donald Duck and is the creator of Scrooge McDuck. He lived in Goleta during the 1970s.
 Danny Duffy, professional baseball player in MLB, plays for the Kansas City Royals
 Burnett Guffey, Oscar-winning cinematographer
 Lagwagon, a melodic punk band
 Katy Perry, pop singer
 Derrick William Plourde (1971–2005) was an American drummer, musician, and artist
 Kim Wilson, blues singer and musician
 Jean Louise Hodgkins (1914–1987) and Vera B. Skubic (1921–1998) built two houses in Del Playa Drive that, with a third one, were historic evidence of the mid-20th century international style presented by architect Richard B. Taylor. "A guide to architecture in Los Angeles & Southern California" said that the three houses built in Del Playa by Richard Taylor were the only objects of architectural note in the area.
 Kent McClard, owner and operator of Ebullition Records (a hardcore-punk record label) and former publisher of HeartattaCk, an internationally distributed punk zine.

See also

 Santa Barbara, California
 Isla Vista, California
 Goleta Slough
 Campus Point State Marine Conservation Area
 Goleta Depot
 History of Santa Barbara, California
 South Coast Railroad Museum
 Goleta Union School District
 Dos Pueblos High School
 Goleta Education Foundation

References

External links

 
 City map showing current boundaries
 City of Goleta's Capital Improvement Project website
 City of Goleta's San Jose Creek Project website
 City of Goleta's Monarch Butterfly Grove website
 Goleta Chamber Of Commerce website
  Goleta Union School District website
 Movies and televisions shows filmed in Goleta

 
Cities in Santa Barbara County, California
Incorporated cities and towns in California
Populated coastal places in California
Former census-designated places in California
2002 establishments in California
Populated places established in 2002